Gerald Frank Shove (November 1887 – 11August 1947) was a British economist. He was involved in the economics debates in Cambridge in the 1920s and 1930s.

Biography
Shove was born at Faversham, Kent, the son of Herbert Samuel Shove and his wife Bertha Millen. His younger brother was the Olympic rower Ralph Shove.

He was educated at Uppingham School and King's College, Cambridge, where he became a member of the Cambridge Apostles.

He married in 1915 Fredegond Maitland, daughter of historian Frederic William Maitland and his wife the playwright Florence Henrietta Fisher. In World War I he was a conscientious objector, like many others in the Bloomsbury Group, of which he was a member; he worked as a poultry keeper at Garsington, the home of Lady Ottoline Morrell.

His academic career was spent at King's College, Cambridge, becoming lecturer in 1923, Fellow in 1926, and Reader in 1945. He was involved in the economics debates in Cambridge in the 1920 and 30s. His interests included diminishing returns, imperfect competition and developing tools to deal with complexity.

He died at Old Hunstanton and was buried at the Parish of the Ascension Burial Ground in Cambridge; his wife Fredegond was also interred in the same burial plot. After his death all his economic notes were destroyed.

Publications
"Varying Costs and Marginal Net Products," Economic Journal, 38 (150) pp. 258–266, 1928 
"Increasing Returns and the Representative Firm",Economic Journal, 40 (157), 1930
"The Place of Marshall's Principles in the Development of Economic Theory", EJ, 1942.
"Mrs Robinson on Marxian Economics", EJ, 1944.

Further reading
Blaug, Mark – ''Who's who in Economics, 3d ed. (1999)

References

External links 
 Gerald Frank Shove (1887–1947), Economist: Sitter in 9 portraits (National Portrait Gallery)
 

1887 births
1947 deaths
People educated at Uppingham School
Alumni of King's College, Cambridge
Fellows of King's College, Cambridge
British economists
Historians of economic thought
British conscientious objectors
People from Faversham